Ice Poison (Bing Du) is a 2014 Taiwanese drama film directed by Midi Z. It was screened in the Panorama section of the 64th Berlin International Film Festival, and was selected as the Taiwanese entry for the Best Foreign Language Film at the 87th Academy Awards, but was not nominated.

Cast
 Wang Shin-hong
 Wu Ke-xi

See also
 List of submissions to the 87th Academy Awards for Best Foreign Language Film
 List of Taiwanese submissions for the Academy Award for Best Foreign Language Film

References

External links
 
 Berlinale Annual Archive 2014 Film File

2014 films
2014 drama films
Taiwanese drama films
Films directed by Midi Z
2010s Mandarin-language films